The East Antarctic Ice Sheet (EAIS) is one of two large ice sheets in Antarctica, and the largest on the entire planet. The EAIS lies between 45° west and 168° east longitudinally.

It is separated from the WAIS by the Transantarctic Mountains. It is home to the geographic South Pole and the Amundsen–Scott South Pole Station.

Temperature changes 
Cooling in East Antarctica during the decades of the 1980s and 1990s partially offset the impact of climate change on the West Antarctic Ice Sheet, which has warmed by more than 0.1 °C/decade in the last 50 years. The continent-wide average surface temperature trend of Antarctica is positive and statistically significant at >0.05 °C/decade since 1957.

Ice mass changes 
An early analysis of GRACE-based studies data indicated that the EAIS was losing mass at a rate of 57 billion tonnes per year and that the total Antarctic ice sheet (including WAIS, and EAIS coastal areas) was losing mass at a rate of 152 cubic kilometers (c. 139 billion tonnes) per year.

Because it is currently gaining mass, East Antarctic Ice Sheet is not expected to play a role in the 21st century sea level rise. However, it would play an increasingly larger role after 2100 if global warming were to reach higher levels. The 2019 IPCC SROCC used the findings of three studies to estimate the potential sea level rise by the year 2300: it suggested that under the Representative Concentration Pathway 8.5, which is associated with continually increasing anthropogenic emissions, sea level rise from Antarctica alone would amount to a median of 1.46 metres (with a confidence interval between 60 cm and 2.89 metres), with some of that contribution coming from the EAIS. These findings were subsequently cited in the 2021 IPCC Sixth Assessment Report. 

If the warming were to remain at elevated levels for a long time, the East Antarctic Ice Sheet would eventually become the dominant contributor to sea level rise, simply because it contains far more ice than any other large ice mass. However, this would require very high warming and a lot of time: in 2022, an extensive assessment of tipping points in the climate system published in the Science Magazine concluded that it would most likely be committed to complete ice loss only once the global warming reaches 7.5°C: the absolute minimum level would be at 5°C, but it could just as easily bet at 10°C. Likewise, the absolute minimum timescale for the complete disappearance of the EAIS even under those conditions is 10,000 years. If it were to disappear, then the change in ice-albedo feedback would increase the global temperature by 0.6°C, while the regional temperatures would increase by around 2°C. However, Wilkes Basin and several other subglacial basins like the nearby Aurora Basin are a lot more vulnerable, and could be committed to irreversible loss around 3°C, with a range between 2°C	and 6°C. Their collapse would then take between 500 and 10,000 years (with a median of 2000 years), but would increase sea level by several metres even without involving the rest of the ice sheet.  

Territorial claims 

Many countries hold a claim on portions of Antarctica. Within EAIS, the United Kingdom, France, Norway, Australia, Chile and Argentina all claim a portion (sometimes overlapping) as their own territory.

See also 
 Antarctic ice sheet
 Scientific consensus on climate change

References

External links 
 E. J. Steig summary of paper on warming in West Antarctica referenced herein
 Nature journal cover image depicting warming in Antarctica

 

Ice sheets of Antarctica
East Antarctica